Edward Harrison Crane (born August 15, 1944) is an American libertarian and co-founder of the Cato Institute. He served as its president until October 1, 2012.

In the 1970s, he was one of the most active leaders within the Libertarian Party.  He directed the Party as its National Chair from 1974 to 1977, worked on John Hospers's Presidential bid and managed Ed Clark's 1978 campaign for Governor of California. In 1980, Crane served as communications director to the Libertarian Party presidential ticket of Clark and vice presidential candidate David Koch. Prior to founding the Cato Institute, Crane was chartered financial analyst and vice president of Alliance Capital in California.

Crane has been a member of the board of various political organizations, including Americans for Limited Government, a group that assists grassroots efforts throughout the country, and the Center for Competitive Politics.  Crane is also a member of the Mont Pelerin Society.

Tenure at Cato Institute
In 1977, with the funding of Charles Koch and the assistance of Murray Rothbard, Crane established the Cato Institute, a libertarian think-tank.

While at Cato, Crane grew the organization: from a staff of 10 and a budget of $800,000 when it first opened in San Francisco, to a staff of 127 and a $21 million budget in a newly renovated building in Washington, DC.

In 2012, a shareholder dispute arose between Crane and Charles and David Koch. Crane accused the Kochs of trying to take control of the organization. The Kochs contended that the shares of deceased shareholder William Niskanen should have been offered to the Institute first, and not passed to his widow. Crane later said that he spoke to New Yorker journalist Jane Meyer, whose reporting indicated the conflict was also about the ideological direction of the Institute. As part of the dispute settlement, the Cato shareholder agreement was dissolved and Crane agreed to retire.

In 2013 Crane launched Purple PAC, a super-PAC that supports candidates and causes consistent with the libertarian philosophy.

Political views
Crane is politically libertarian. He has described the core principles of libertarianism as being personal liberty, free markets and limited government.

He was supportive of then-presidential candidate Ron Paul on issues such as cutting spending, lowering taxes, support for a non-interventionist foreign policy, protecting civil liberties and promoting Austrian economics. "Support for dynamic market capitalism (as opposed to crony capitalism), social tolerance, and a healthy skepticism of foreign military adventurism is a combination of views held by a plurality of Americans," he states in his column. "It is why the 21st century is likely to be a libertarian century. It is why the focus should be on Ron Paul's philosophy and his policy proposals in 2012."

In 2016 he supported presidential candidate Rand Paul. It was reported that Crane had stopped raising money for the Purple PAC that was supporting Rand; but Crane stated that the PAC was still operating and it wasn't shutting down. He stated, "I'm still 'standing with Rand,' as they say, and there's no one else I can think of supporting."

References

External links
 Cato Institute – Edward Crane bio
 

1944 births
Living people
Activists from California
American political activists
California Libertarians
Cato Institute people
Libertarian National Committee chairs
Monetary reformers
Non-interventionism
CFA charterholders
Marshall School of Business alumni
University of California, Berkeley alumni